The 2009 Omloop Het Nieuwsblad cycle race took place on 28 February 2009. It was the 64th edition of the international classic Omloop Het Nieuwsblad, and the first time after the name changed from Omloop Het Volk. The race was won by Thor Hushovd in an 18-man sprint in Ghent, ahead of Kevin Ista and Juan Antonio Flecha.

Results

References

2009
Omloop Het Nieuwsblad
Omloop Het Nieuwsblad
Omloop Het Nieuwsblad